Rhys Joseph Wesser (born 31 March 1979) is an Australian former professional rugby league footballer who played as a . During his 14 seasons in the NRL, he played for the Penrith Panthers, with whom he won the 2003 NRL Premiership, and the South Sydney Rabbitohs. His 113 tries for the Penrith Panthers is a club record. Wesser was also a Queensland and Indigenous Dreamtime representative.

Background
Born in Rockhampton, Queensland, Wesser is of Aboriginal and South Sea Islander (Vanuatuan) descent. He played junior rugby league in his hometown with the Rockhampton Brothers.

At age 16, Wesser was selected for the Queensland under-17s representative side. Wesser finished his schooling at Emmaus College, Rockhampton, and also helped his School side take out the Mal Meninga Under 19s Cup, being the fourth fastest 19-year-old in the state, running times around 100 metres in 11 seconds.

Professional playing career

Penrith Panthers
Debuting in 1998 Wesser moved from his hometown of Rockhampton to the foot of the Blue Mountains, New South Wales, to play for the Penrith Panthers but he found trouble in pushing for a first-grade spot with Peter Jorgensen holding that title.

Three years later Rhys was given the opportunity to play first grade with the departure of Jorgensen. Wesser scored ten tries in his debut season despite Penrith finishing last on the premiership table.

In 2002, he scored a Penrith club record of nineteen tries, including three hat-tricks, and was dubbed "Rhys-Lightning" and soon became a crowd favourite with his acceleration and line-breaking ability. The following season Wesser bettered his own record by scoring on 25 occasions, earning the title of the most prolific try-scoring fullback for a season in the history of Australian rugby league. The Panthers won their second premiership title, beat the Sydney Roosters in the 2003 NRL grand final in which Wesser played at fullback.

As 2003 NRL premiers, the Penrith travelled to England to face 2003 Super League champions, the Bradford Bulls in the 2004 World Club Challenge. Wesser's try-scoring declined in 2004 with the addition of Amos Roberts to the squad but he still scored thirteen tries.

Wesser was selected to play for Queensland in the 2004 State of Origin series.

Wesser made the Aboriginal selection in the exhibition game against the New Zealand Māori side as part of the official opening of the 2008 World Cup on 26 October.

In 2008, Wesser announced that he would be joining the South Sydney Rabbitohs in 2009 for a two-year deal. Wesser's 113 tries is the most scored by any Penrith player.

South Sydney Rabbitohs
In only the second round of the 2009 season, his first with Souths, Wesser injured his knee. He made his return to the field in the 2010 NRL season.

On 12 August 2011, Wesser announced that he would be retiring at the end of the season. He was unable to finish his final season of Rugby League due to another knee injury sustained late in the season.

References

External links
Rhys Wesser at Rugby League Tables
Official Penrith Panthers Webpage
Penrith Panthers vs Melbourne Storm Round 5 2005

1979 births
Living people
Australian Aboriginal rugby league team players
Australian people of Vanuatuan descent
Australian rugby league players
Indigenous Australian rugby league players
North Sydney Bears NSW Cup players
Penrith Panthers players
Queensland Rugby League State of Origin players
Rugby league fullbacks
Rugby league players from Rockhampton, Queensland
South Sydney Rabbitohs players